Forrest Clyde "Whitey" Baccus (November 13, 1911 – August 1, 1968) was a college basketball player and men's college basketball head coach at Southern Methodist University. Baccus was a forward for the SMU Mustangs men's basketball team for three seasons. He received all-Southwest Conference honors and was recognized as a third-team All-American by Converse following the 1934–35 season, in which he captained SMU's first-ever Southwest Conference championship team in basketball under head coach Jimmie St. Clair. He would go on to coach SMU in basketball for six seasons (1938–42, 1945–47), finishing with an overall record of 55–71 (.437).

Head coaching record

References

1911 births
1968 deaths
All-American college men's basketball players
American men's basketball coaches
American men's basketball players
Basketball coaches from Texas
Basketball players from Texas
College men's basketball head coaches in the United States
SMU Mustangs football players
SMU Mustangs men's basketball coaches
SMU Mustangs men's basketball players
Forwards (basketball)